The Penske PC-12 was an CART open-wheel race car, designed by Penske Racing, which was constructed for competition in the 1984 IndyCar season.

References

Racing cars
American Championship racing cars